A Walk in the Sun is a 1945 American war film based on the novel by Harry Brown, who was a writer for Yank, the Army Weekly based in England. The book was serialized in Liberty Magazine in October 1944.

The film was directed by Lewis Milestone, stars Dana Andrews and features Richard Conte, George Tyne, John Ireland, Lloyd Bridges, Sterling Holloway, Norman Lloyd, Herbert Rudley and Richard Benedict, with narration by Burgess Meredith.

In 2016, the film was deemed "culturally, historically, or aesthetically significant" by the United States Library of Congress, and selected for preservation in its National Film Registry.

Plot

In September 1943, the diverse group of fifty-three soldiers comprising a lead Platoon of the Texas Division anxiously await their upcoming Allied invasion of Italy on a beach near Salerno, Italy.  A landing barge carries them to their objective during the pre-dawn hours, and the increasing danger of their situation is demonstrated when their young platoon leader, Lieutenant Rand, is wounded by a shell fragment that destroys half of his face. Platoon Sergeant Pete Halverson takes over command and orders Sgt. Eddie Porter to lead the men to the beach while he tries to find the company commander and confirm their orders.

First aid man McWilliams remains with Rand, and the rest of the men hit the beach and dig in while trying to elude the shelling and machine-gun fire. Sgt. Bill Tyne wonders what they will do if Halverson does not return, and after the sun rises, the sergeants send the men into the woods to protect them from enemy aircraft. Tyne remains on the beach to wait for Halverson, but learns from McWilliams that both Rand and Halverson are dead. Soon after, McWilliams is shot by an enemy airplane when he goes to a bluff to view the aerial attack on the beachhead.

Tyne walks to the woods and there discovers that three other men have been hit, including Sgt. Hoskins who was the senior surviving NCO. Hoskins' wound means he cannot continue and Porter as the next senior NCO is forced to take command. Hoskins warns Tyne as he is leaving to keep an eye on Porter because he suspects Porter is going to crack under the pressure of command.

Porter, Tyne and Sgt. Ward then lead the men in three squads along a road toward their objective, a bridge that they are to blow up that is near a farmhouse. Porter knows that the six-mile journey will be a dangerous one, and grows agitated.  He warns the men to watch out for enemy tanks and aircraft. As they walk, the men shoot the breeze and discuss their likes and dislikes, the nature of war and the food they wish they were eating. Enemy aircraft appear and one of them strafes the platoon as they run for cover in a ditch. Some of the men are killed while one is wounded, Pvt. Smith. Porter grows increasingly agitated.

Afterwards Porter is distracted when two retreating Italian soldiers surrender to the platoon and confirm that they are on the right road. The Italians warn them that the area is controlled by German troops, and soon after, the platoon meets a small reconnaissance patrol of American soldiers. After the patrol's motorcycle driver offers to ride to the farmhouse and report back, Porter becomes even more edgy as minutes pass without the driver's return. Finally Tyne tells the men to take a break while he sits with Porter. As machine gunner Rivera and his pal, Jake Friedman, razz each other, Porter begins to break down and tells Ward (also called Farmer) that he is putting Tyne in charge. Porter has a complete breakdown when a German armored car approaches, but Tyne's quick thinking prevails and the men blast the car with grenades and machine-gun fire. The bazooka men, who Tyne had sent ahead to search for tanks, blow up two tanks and another armored car, but expend all of their bazooka ammunition.

Tyne leaves a private named Johnson to guard the still-crying Porter, while putting PFC. Windy Craven, a calm, introspective soldier, in charge of his squad. Tyne pushes on, and as the men march, Friedman tells Rivera that he is a travelling salesman who is "selling democracy to the natives." The men finally reach the farmhouse, but when a small patrol lead by Ward attempts to crawl through the field in front of the house, they are shot at by the Germans, and two men are killed. Tyne and Ward are baffled about what to do next when Windy, suggests circling around the farm via the river and blowing up the bridge without first taking the house. Tyne sends two patrols, headed by Ward and Windy, to accomplish the mission, then orders Rivera to strafe the house while he leads a column of men in an attack on the house, which he hopes will distract the Germans. The remaining men nervously wait for their comrades to reach the bridge, until finally Rivera opens fire and Tyne and his men go over the stone wall and into the field. Tyne's sight blurs as he crawls toward the house, and when he comes across the body of Tim Rankin, one of the fallen men, still cradling his beloved Tommy-gun, the platoon's constant refrain, "Nobody dies," resounds through his head.

The bridge is blown up, and despite heavy losses, including Archimbeau the platoon scout, the platoon captures the house. Then, at exactly noon, Windy, Ward and the remaining men wander through the house as Farmer fulfils his dream of eating an apple and Tyne adds another notch to the butt of Rankin's pet Tommy-gun.

Cast

 Dana Andrews as Staff Sgt. Bill Tyne
 Richard Conte as Pvt. Rivera
 George Tyne as Pvt. Jake Friedman
 John Ireland as PFC. Windy Craven
 Lloyd Bridges as Staff Sgt. Ward
 Sterling Holloway as Pvt. 'Mac' McWilliams
 Norman Lloyd as Pvt. Jack 'Arch' Archimbeau
 Herbert Rudley as Staff Sgt. Eddie Porter
 Richard Benedict as PFC. Tranella
 Huntz Hall as PFC. Carraway
 James Cardwell as Sgt. 'Hosk' Hoskins
 George Offerman Jr. as Pvt. Tinker
 Steve Brodie as Pvt. Judson
 Matt Willis as Plt. Sgt. Pete 'Hal' Halverson
 Chris Drake as PFC. Tim Rankin
 Alvin Hammer as Pvt. Johnson
 Victor Cutler as Pvt. Cousins
 Jay Norris as Pvt. James
 John Kellogg as Pvt. Riddle
Uncredited Cast
 Danny Desmond as Pvt. Trasker  
 Robert Horton as Pvt. Joe Jack
 Tony Dante as Pvt. Giorgio
 Robert Lowell as Lt. Rand
 Burgess Meredith as Narrator

Production
Actor Burgess Meredith, who eventually narrated the film, persuaded his friend Samuel Bronston to produce a film based on the book by Harry Brown. Due to problems with creditors, Bronston had to shut down production and the project was taken over by Superior Productions, which included the director Lewis Milestone Bronston filed a lawsuit, and in an out-of-court settlement received 21.25% of the film's profits. The film was shot at 20th Century Fox's ranch, alongside that studio's production of A Bell for Adano.

The Army assigned Colonel Thomas D. Drake to the film as technical advisor. Drake had risen from private to sergeant in World War I.  He was later commissioned and eventually commanded the 168th Infantry Regiment of the 34th Infantry Division in the North African campaign, where he and his regiment were captured by the Germans at the Battle of Kasserine Pass. Drake had recently been exchanged as a prisoner by the Germans due to his ill health, returning to the States in 1944.

Because of war-time shortages, US vehicles and aircraft stand in as enemy vehicles; most notably an American half-track is painted as a German half-track, and a P-51 plays the role of an "enemy" aircraft (probably intended to be either a C.205 or Bf 109).  Later, P-38s (as American aircraft) engage a radial engined "enemy" plane (a T-6 Texan posing as a Fw 190) during the film's climax.

In January 1945, Milestone showed the film to the U.S. Army for their approval. The Army was pleased with the film but requested two changes. They suggested that a remark be placed in the film explaining why the bazooka was not used during the attack on the farmhouse. Milestone complied with this request by shooting a scene where the bazooka crew reported that they used up all their shells in a battle with enemy tanks. The Army also requested a briefing scene at the film's beginning to explain the platoon's mission. They believed the film gave the impression that the platoon meandered about without an objective. Milestone authorized the shooting of such a scene but whether it was filmed but later edited out of the release no one is sure; however, a brief scene in the landing craft has the platoon sergeant explaining to the men, and the audience, that they had been briefed on their mission.

Though several film companies showed strong interest in acquiring the film, 20th Century Fox acquired the film for release in July 1945 so as not to compete with Fox's A Bell for Adano released earlier. However, when Japan surrendered, Fox's head of production, Darryl F. Zanuck, stopped production of all war films. The film was released in June 1946 to critical and popular acclaim but also a strong critique of the film from director Samuel Fuller, which he sent in the form of a letter to Milestone.

Robert Rossen's screenplay follows Brown's book very closely. Milestone also recommended that Brown become a screenwriter in Hollywood, which led to a prolific career.

Soundtrack
Milestone commissioned ballads from Millard Lampell and Earl Robinson to accompany the action at intervals throughout the film.  The songs, which were sung by Kenneth Spencer, replaced much of composer Freddie Rich's original instrumental score. The ballad in A Walk in the Sun predates the ballad in High Noon, which also accompanied the film's narrative.
Robinson and Lampell wrote other ballads that were deleted from the final print of the film due to objections, not only from composer Rich, but due to the comments of several preview audiences, who did not like the songs.

Songs composed for the film include -

 Ballad of the Lead Platoon
 Texas Division
 Waiting
 One Little Job 
 The Platoon Started Out
 Six-Mile Walk
 Trouble A-Coming
 Texas Division Blues
 They Met Hitler's Best
  Moving In
 "Black and White"
 Walk in the Sun

Traditional music
 The Army Goes Rolling Along  by Edmund L. Gruber

Reception

The review in PM was both extensive and positive: “’A Walk in the Sun’ is so different—materially and intentionally—from any other film dramatization of the war that it is difficult to judge it by the usual standards of comparison. Yet it seems to be the most satisfying of the soldier films—the most convincing in its portraiture of the U.S. soldier, the least contrived in plot and characterization and the first war film to attempt successfully a style and composition of its own....Yet it is not the theme ballad, nor the sparse though mighty excitement of the film’s moments of combat, that make [it] a memorable film. Rather it is most distinguished for the real and comradely relationships among men of varying origins and modes of life, for its vital and sparkling dialogue...and for its unaccented tribute to the resourcefulness of the American soldier, working out battle problems with the co-operation and efficiency of a smart football team.”

Re-release
A Walk in the Sun was reissued by Realart Pictures in 1951 as Salerno Beachhead. In the 1980s the film was released on VHS tape.

In 2022,  A Walk in the Sun was reissued after restoration by the UCLA Film & Television Archive in cooperation with the British Film Institute using a 35mm nitrate fine grain master positive and a 35mm acetate composite dupe negative. It was issued on Blu-Ray disc by Kit Parker Films.

Notes

External links

 
 
 
 
 A Walk in the Draft

1945 films
1940s war drama films
20th Century Fox films
American war drama films
American black-and-white films
Films based on American novels
Films based on military novels
Films directed by Lewis Milestone
Films scored by Freddie Rich
Films with screenplays by Robert Rossen
Italian Campaign of World War II films
World War II films based on actual events
World War II films made in wartime
United States National Film Registry films
1945 drama films